The CWA World Heavyweight Championship was a professional wrestling world heavyweight championship in the American promotion, the Continental Wrestling Association. It existed from 1979 to 1981.

Title history

Footnotes

See also
Continental Wrestling Association
CWA World Tag Team Championship

References

World heavyweight wrestling championships
Continental Wrestling Association championships
Professional wrestling in Memphis, Tennessee